Falconer is the self-titled first album by Swedish power metal band Falconer. In 2017, Loudwire ranked it as the 14th best power metal album of all time.

Track listing
All songs written by Stefan Weinerhall.

Credits
 Mathias Blad - vocals, keyboards
 Stefan Weinerhall - guitars, bass
 Karsten Larsson - drums
 Ulrika Olausson - guest vocals on "Töres döttrar i Wänge"

References

2001 debut albums
Falconer (band) albums
Metal Blade Records albums